Tuffour is a surname. Notable people with the surname include:

Dennis Tuffour (born 1989), English rugby league player
Emmanuel Tuffour (born 1966), Ghanaian sprinter
Nana Tuffour (1954–2020), Ghanaian singer and songwriter